Ian McGrane (born November 22, 1995) is an American soccer player who playing for Union Omaha in USL League One as a goalkeeper.

Career

College & Amateur
McGrane began playing college soccer at Monroe College in 2014. He transferred to the University of Wisconsin–Green Bay, but didn't appear for them during his time there. In 2016, McGrane transferred again, this time to the University of South Carolina.

While in college, McGrane had spells with NPSL side FC Miami City in 2016, as well as with USL PDL side SC United Bantams in both 2017 and 2018.

McGrane returned to the NPSL in 2019, playing with AFC Ann Arbor.

Professional
In September 2019, McGrane signed for NISA side Stumptown Athletic ahead of the league's inaugural season.

McGrane signed with the Tampa Bay Rowdies of USLC on January 31, 2020. Following the 2021 season it was announced that McGrane would leave the Rowdies.

In May 2022, McGrane moved to MLS Next Pro side St. Louis City SC 2. McGrane's contract option was declined in November 2022.

References

External links
 Profile at Monroe College Athletics
 Profile at University of Wisconsin-Green Bay Athletics
 Profile at University of South Carolina Athletics
 Stumptown Athletic profile
 NISA profile

1995 births
Living people
American soccer players
Association football goalkeepers
Green Bay Phoenix men's soccer players
South Carolina Gamecocks men's soccer players
FC Miami City players
SC United Bantams players
Stumptown AC players
Tampa Bay Rowdies players
Soccer players from Pennsylvania
National Premier Soccer League players
USL League Two players
National Independent Soccer Association players
People from Kingston, Pennsylvania
MLS Next Pro players
St. Louis City SC 2 players
Union Omaha players